Kameryn Louise "Kami" Craig (born July 21, 1987) is an American water polo player. She was a member of the US water polo team that won a silver medal at the 2008 Beijing Olympics and a gold medal in London in 2012 and Rio in 2016.

Craig attended Santa Barbara High School, graduating in 2005 and the University of Southern California, graduating in 2010.  She played water polo for the Trojans.

Career
Craig played on the women's varsity team in high school as well as playing on the Youth National Team from 2003 to 2006. She played for four years at USC.

In June 2009, Kami was named to the USA water polo women's senior national team for the 2009 FINA World Championships.

In 2011, she played her first professional season in Greece, playing for the Greek giants Olympiacos.

Awards and honors
She, UCLA women's water polo senior Tanya Gandy, and her teammate Michelle Stein have been selected as the three finalists for the 2009 Peter J. Cutino Award, an accolade presented annually to the outstanding female and male collegiate water polo players in the United States. The winners were announced at the 10th annual Peter J. Cutino Awards Night Dinner on Saturday, June 6, at The Olympic Club's City Clubhouse in San Francisco.

She was the 2009 Peter J. Cutino Award female winner.

Craig won the Peter J. Cutino Award again in 2010, making her the only female player to have won it twice in a row.

Personal life
While at USC, Craig majored in sociology and minored in occupational therapy.

See also
 United States women's Olympic water polo team records and statistics
 List of Olympic champions in women's water polo
 List of Olympic medalists in water polo (women)
 List of players who have appeared in multiple women's Olympic water polo tournaments
 List of world champions in women's water polo
 List of World Aquatics Championships medalists in water polo

References

External links

 
USC player bio

1987 births
Living people
American female water polo players
Water polo centre forwards
Olympiacos Women's Water Polo Team players
USC Trojans women's water polo players
Water polo players at the 2008 Summer Olympics
Water polo players at the 2012 Summer Olympics
Water polo players at the 2016 Summer Olympics
Medalists at the 2008 Summer Olympics
Medalists at the 2012 Summer Olympics
Medalists at the 2016 Summer Olympics
Olympic gold medalists for the United States in water polo
Olympic silver medalists for the United States in water polo
World Aquatics Championships medalists in water polo
Water polo players at the 2011 Pan American Games
Water polo players at the 2015 Pan American Games
Pan American Games medalists in water polo
Pan American Games gold medalists for the United States
People from Camarillo, California
Medalists at the 2011 Pan American Games
Medalists at the 2015 Pan American Games